Isoberlinia tomentosa is a hardwood tree native to the African tropical savannas and Guinean forest-savanna mosaic dry forests. At one time this tree was disregarded as a useful resource, but with the selective felling of such valuable species as Khaya senegalensis and Afzelia africana, it is now better appreciated.

References

Detarioideae
Flora of West Tropical Africa
Trees of Africa
Flora of Nigeria
Taxa named by Hermann Harms